Robert Walker (born 23 July 1942) is an English former professional footballer who played as a central defender. He played in the Football League for Brighton & Hove Albion, Bournemouth and Colchester United.

Walker began his career at non-league Gateshead before joining Football League club Brighton & Hove Albion in 1962. After one season he played the next with Southern League Ashford Town (Kent). At the start of the 1964–65 campaign he joined Football League club Hartlepool United but after a brief stay in which he made no appearances he returned to the Southern League for four matches with Margate. Early in 1965 Walker returned to the Football League joining Bournemouth. He subsequently moved to Colchester United for the 1967–68 season.

Thereafter Walker played non-league football for Dover, Bedford Town and Salisbury.

References

External links

Player Profile - Bob Walker Colchester United archive database
Bob Walker Margate Football Club History
Bob Walker player profile Nuts and Bolts Archive: History of Ashford Town 

1942 births
Living people
Sportspeople from Wallsend
Footballers from Tyne and Wear
English footballers
Association football defenders
Gateshead F.C. players
Brighton & Hove Albion F.C. players
Ashford United F.C. players
Hartlepool United F.C. players
Margate F.C. players
AFC Bournemouth players
Colchester United F.C. players
Dover F.C. players
Bedford Town F.C. players
Salisbury City F.C. players
English Football League players
Southern Football League players